Joculator antonioi is a species of minute sea snails, marine gastropod molluscs in the family Cerithiopsidae. It was described by Cecalupo and Perugia in 2012.

References

External links
 Holotype in MNHN, Paris

Gastropods described in 2012
antonioi